Tha Khum Ngoen is a village and tambon (subdistrict) of Mae Tha District, in Lamphun Province, Thailand. In 2005 it had a population of  6858 people. The tambon contains 11  villages.

References

Tambon of Lamphun province
Populated places in Lamphun province